Antouman Jallow (born 11 June 1981, in Uppsala) is a Swedish soccer player of Gambian heritage.

Career

Early Career in Sweden
Jallow was part of the youth system at his hometown club, IK Sirius, and was captain of the team which came second in Sweden's U-19 national championship. He played for Sirius in the Swedish second division from 2000–2001, scoring 12 goals in 30 games.

College
Jallow left Uppsala to attend university at and play college soccer at the University of Wisconsin–Milwaukee in 2002. He was both the team MVP and Horizon League player of the year in 2004.

Professional
Jallow was drafted in the fourth round (41st overall) of the 2005 MLS SuperDraft by San Jose Earthquakes, but chose not to sign with the team.

Instead, Jallow moved back to Sweden, and spent the next two years playing for Gefle IF and IK Sirius. He scored 15 goals in 22 games for Sirius in the Superettan in 2007.

In January 2009, Jallow signed with the Portland Timbers of the USL First Division., but made just 2 starts fior the team before being loaned to Swedish Division 2 Club Sandvikens IF. He was released from his Portland contract on December 7, 2009.

References

External links
 Portland Timbers bio

1981 births
Living people
Expatriate soccer players in the United States
Gefle IF players
Portland Timbers (2001–2010) players
Swedish footballers
USL First Division players
Swedish people of Gambian descent
Milwaukee Panthers men's soccer players
Sandvikens IF players
San Jose Earthquakes draft picks

Association football forwards
Footballers from Uppsala